Lander Road, located northeast of Soda Springs, Idaho, was listed on the National Register of Historic Places in 1975.

It is a historic road used by wagons, designed by Frederick W. Lander.

References

Roads on the National Register of Historic Places in Idaho
Buildings and structures completed in 1858
Caribou County, Idaho